Natalie Bailey is a screenwriter and director, known for her work on TV series in the UK, US and Australia.

Early life
Bailey emigrated to the UK from Australia in 2000.

Career
Bailey has worked in the production and direction of many TV comedies led by Armando Iannucci, including Time Trumpet, The Thick of It, VEEP,  and Avenue 5. Other television directing credits which include Pramface, Loaded, Damned and Run for HBO.

She directed the 2021 comedy drama TV miniseries on SBS, The Unusual Suspects. Bailey directed episodes five, six, and seven of the streaming series Joe vs. Carole.

References

Australian women television writers
Australian women television directors
Living people
Year of birth missing (living people)
Australian expatriates in England
Australian television writers
Australian television directors